Jaitharia or Jetharia is a clan of Bhumihar (Babhan) community. They are mostly found in the Saran, Muzaffarpur and Vaishali district of Bihar, India.

History
The rulers of Bettiah Raj belonged to Jaitharia clan of Bhumihar.

See also
Bhumihar
Bettiah Raj

References

Social groups of Bihar
Brahmin communities of Bihar
Bhumihar clans